Xylotoles selwini is a species of beetle in the family Cerambycidae that was described by Olliff in 1888. It occurs in Australia.

References

Dorcadiini
Beetles described in 1888